Marcelo Gonçalves Vieira (born 25 July 1976, in Minas Gerais), commonly known as Vavá, is a retired Brazilian footballer who holds a Bulgarian passport as well. He used to play for PFC Belasitsa Petrich and Levski Sofia in Bulgaria.
On 31 October 2002, he was sent off in the 0:1 away loss against Austrian side Sturm Graz in the third round of the UEFA Cup only two minutes after coming on as a substitute.

References

External links
 Profile in levskisofia.info

1976 births
Living people
Brazilian footballers
Bulgarian footballers
Brazilian expatriate footballers
PFC Belasitsa Petrich players
PFC Levski Sofia players
Expatriate footballers in Bulgaria
Association football forwards
Sportspeople from Minas Gerais
Brazilian expatriate sportspeople in Bulgaria
First Professional Football League (Bulgaria) players